Betty Youngblood was President of Lake Superior State University in Sault Ste. Marie, MI from 2002 to 2007. Previously she was President and Professor of political science at Western Oregon University and chancellor of the University of Wisconsin-Superior. She was preceded as president of Lake Superior State by President Arbuckle and succeeded by Dr. Rodney L. Lowman.

References

Living people
People from Sault Ste. Marie, Michigan
Lake Superior State University faculty
Western Oregon University faculty
University of Wisconsin–Superior
Heads of universities and colleges in the United States
Year of birth missing (living people)